Beijing Government may refer to:

 Beijing or Beijing Municipality, the capital of the People's Republic of China
 Politics of Beijing, a dual party-government system ruling the city of Beijing
 Beiyang Government, a series of military regimes that ruled from Beijing from 1912 to 1928
 People's Republic of China (PRC), a sovereign state with its seat of government in Beijing
 Li Keqiang is the current Chinese Premier, the head of government of China

See also
 Beijing Coup, a 1924 coup d'état in China
 State Council of the People's Republic of China, chief administrative authority of the PRC
 Taipei Government